1863 Antinous , provisional designation , is a stony asteroid and near-Earth object, approximately 2–3 kilometers in diameter. It was discovered on 7 March 1948 by American astronomer Carl Wirtanen at Lick Observatory on the summit of Mount Hamilton, California. It was named after Antinous from Greek mythology.

Orbit and classification 
Antinous is also classified as a Mars-crosser and Apollo asteroid. The SU/Sq-type asteroid orbits the Sun in the inner main-belt at a distance of 0.9–3.6 AU once every 3 years and 5 months (1,240 days). Its orbit has an eccentricity of 0.61 and an inclination of 18° with respect to the ecliptic.

It has an Earth Minimum orbit intersection distance (MOID) of 0.1836 AU. In the 20th century Antinous passed within 30 Gm of the Earth five times; it will do so only once in the 21st. The nearest distance increases each time, from 26 to 29 Gm.

Physical characteristics 
In the Tholen and SMASS taxonomic scheme, Antinous is characterized as a SU and Sq type, respectively, which are subtypes of the broader group of S-type asteroids. The Apollo asteroid has a rotation period of 7.46 hours and an albedo between 0.10 and 0.240,

Naming 

This minor planet was named after Antinous from Greek mythology. Antinous was one of the many unwelcome suitors for Penelope's hand while her husband, Odysseus, was away on his travels (also see 201 Penelope and 1143 Odysseus). Antinous, being the most insolent of all, was the first to be killed by Odysseus on his return. The official  was published by the Minor Planet Center on 20 February 1976.

Notes

References

External links 
 Asteroid Lightcurve Database (LCDB), query form (info )
 Dictionary of Minor Planet Names, Google books
 
 
 

001863
Discoveries by Carl A. Wirtanen
Named minor planets
001863
19480307